The Colorado Eagles are a professional minor league ice hockey team based in Loveland, Colorado. The Eagles play in the Pacific Division of the American Hockey League.

The Eagles were founded as an expansion franchise in 2003 in the Central Hockey League and remained in the league until June 2011, when they joined the ECHL. During their time in the CHL, the Eagles won two Ray Miron President's Cups, three regular season titles, five conference titles and six division titles in eight seasons. The team was granted a membership as an expansion team in the American Hockey League beginning with the 2018–19 season as the affiliate of the Colorado Avalanche of the National Hockey League.

The Eagles play at the Budweiser Events Center in Loveland and serve the Fort Collins – Loveland Metropolitan Statistical Area.

Franchise history

Central Hockey League era (2003–2011) 
The franchise was founded in 2003 by former Montreal Canadiens player Ralph Backstrom. The Eagles advanced to the playoffs in their first season and won the CHL championship in their second season, 2004–05. They won their division in 2005–06, but lost in the second round of the playoffs to the Bossier-Shreveport Mudbugs, after having defeated the Oklahoma City Blazers in the first round. They would again win the CHL Championship in 2006–07, defeating the Laredo Bucks four games to two in the Cup Finals.

After the 2007–08 season, coach Chris Stewart retired, and Kevin McClelland was named as his replacement. Following the 2009–10 season, McClelland was not retained and Stewart, who had been working as team president and general manager since leaving the bench, resumed head coaching duties.

During the 2008–09 season, the Eagles hosted the 2009 CHL All-Star Game and took on a group of CHL All-Stars from various teams. The exhibition took place on January 14, 2009, at the Budweiser Events Center, with the Eagles defeating the CHL All-Stars, 8–4.

Move to ECHL (2011–2018) 
During the 2011 Ray Miron President's Cup playoffs, the Eagles had been rumored to be transferring to the ECHL following the completion of the playoffs. Former International Hockey League commissioner Dennis Hextall has stated that he had heard that the Colorado Eagles may already be included in the ECHL's tentative schedule for the 2011–12 season.

On May 29, 2011, KEVN-TV in Rapid City, South Dakota reported that Colorado was to move to the ECHL in time for the 2011–12 season. The following day, the team announced that they would have a press conference on May 31 at the Budweiser Events Center and that local media were urged to attend and fans urged to listen to the press conference online or on a local radio station. At the press conference, Head Coach, General Manager and President Chris Stewart announced that the team had been accepted as an expansion franchise in the ECHL for the 2011–12 season.

In August 2011, the Eagles were assigned to the Western Conference's Mountain Division as part of the league realignment for the 2011–12 ECHL season.

They served as the second-tier affiliate of the National Hockey League's Winnipeg Jets and the American Hockey League's St. John's IceCaps until the end of the 2012–13 hockey season and then as the Calgary Flames and Adirondack Flames affiliate during the 2014–15 season.

In July 2016, head coach Chris Stewart retired as coach for the second time but remained with the organization as general manager. He was replaced by assistant coach and longtime Eagles player, Aaron Schneekloth. On July 20, the Eagles announced a four-year affiliation with the NHL's Colorado Avalanche and the AHL's San Antonio Rampage after one season of playing independent of affiliations. In their first season with the Avalanche affiliation, the Eagles would go on to finish second in the Mountain Division of the ECHL and then win the Kelly Cup as the 2017 playoffs champions. In their last season in the ECHL in 2017–18, the Eagles finished with back-to-back Kelly Cups with the 2018 playoff championship. Traditionally, the Kelly Cup is held by the winning team during the following season and returned before the playoffs, but the Eagles did not return the trophy to the league after leaving for the AHL and it had to be replaced. They eventually sent it to the 2019 ECHL champion Newfoundland Growlers before opening night of the 2019–20 ECHL season.

Move to the AHL
For the 2017–18 season, the National Hockey League added the Vegas Golden Knights as a 31st team. The approval of a new NHL team also led to discussions of adding a 31st team in the American Hockey League. With the Golden Knights choosing to affiliate with the Chicago Wolves instead of adding their own AHL expansion team, talks with other organizations were opened. The owners and managers of the Eagles began discussions with the Avalanche with interests into becoming an AHL expansion for the 2018–19 season. On October 10, 2017, the Avalanche and the Eagles officially announced that the club would be promoted to the AHL in 2018.

The Avalanche hired Greg Cronin as the Eagles' first AHL head coach and retained former head coach Aaron Schneekloth as an assistant.

Season records
Note: GP = Games played, W = Wins, L = Losses, OTL = Overtime losses, SOL=shootout losses, Pts = Points, GF = Goals for, GA = Goals against, PIM = Penalties in minutes

Records as of end of the 2020–21 AHL season.

Players

Current roster 
Updated March 14, 2023.

|}

Team captains 
 Mark Alt, 2018–20
 Greg Pateryn, 2020–21
 Jayson Megna & Jacob MacDonald (co-captains), 2021–2022
 Brad Hunt, 2023–

Retired numbers

Awards and honors 

Ray Miron President's Cup CHL playoff champion
 2005, 2007

Kelly Cup ECHL playoff champion
 2017, 2018

Bud Poile Governors' Cup
 CHL regular season champion
 2004–05, 2005–06, 2008–09

Conference playoff championship
 2005, 2007, 2008, 2009, 2011, 2017, 2018

Division titles
 2003–04, 2004–05, 2005–06, 2006–07, 2007–08, 2008–09, 2015–16, 2017–18

References

External links 
 Colorado Eagles Official Website

 
American Hockey League teams
Defunct ECHL teams
Ice hockey teams in Colorado
Calgary Flames minor league affiliates
Colorado Avalanche minor league affiliates
Winnipeg Jets minor league affiliates
Loveland, Colorado
Ice hockey clubs established in 2003
2003 establishments in Colorado